Big Day Out 04 is a New Zealand compilation album released to coincide with the Big Day Out music festival in 2004.

Track listing

Disc one
"53rd & 3rd" - Metallica
"This Apparatus Must Be Unearthed" - The Mars Volta
"Are You Gonna Be My Girl" - Jet
"You Were The Last High" - The Dandy Warhols
"White Night" - Hoodoo Gurus
"Get Activated" - Gerling
"MF from Hell" - The Datsuns
"Signals Over the Air" - Thursday
"Déjà Vu" - Something for Kate
"In Your Arms" - Skulker
"Red Morning Light" - Kings of Leon
"Burn Burn" - Lostprophets
"Apathy is a Cold Body" - Poison the Well
"Watch Out Boys" - Magic Dirt
"One Second of Insanity" - The Butterfly Effect
"Real Life" - Cog
"Sophie" - Goodshirt
"Vampire Racecourse" - The Sleepy Jackson
"Growing On Me" - The Darkness

Disc two
"Come to Daddy" - Aphex Twin
"Stockholm Syndrome" - Muse
"Hands Up" - The Black Eyed Peas
"El Questro" - Downsyde
"Again" - Pnau
"Supercide" - Trey
"The Things" - Audio Bullys
"Kick It" - Peaches
"Where Ur At" - 1200 Techniques
"Lucky Star" - Basement Jaxx
"Silver Screen Shower Scene" - Afrika Bambaataa and Soulsonic Force
"Freaky Highway" - sonicanimation
"U Can't Resist Us" - King Kapisi & Che Fu
"Stand Up" - Scribe
"Sneaker Sex" - Friendly vs. Toby Neal
"Heaven or Hell?" - Peewee Ferris
"Slide" - Salmonella Dub
"Do You Realise?" - The Flaming Lips

Music festival compilation albums
Compilation albums by New Zealand artists
2003 live albums
2003 compilation albums